Pattikada Pattanama  is a 1972 Indian Tamil-language romantic comedy film produced and directed by P. Madhavan and written by Bala Murugan. The film stars Sivaji Ganesan and Jayalalithaa. The film deals with Kalpana, an urban woman who marries a villager Mookaiyan. After marriage, differences of opinion arise between the couple as Mookaiyan raises objections about city culture, leading to their separation. The rest of the film is whether Kalpana reforms and the couple reunite or not.

Pattikada Pattanama is based on the William Shakespeare comedy The Taming of the Shrew. It was released on 6 May 1972. The film was commercially successful, running for over 175 days in theatres, thereby becoming a silver jubilee film. It is the only black and white Tamil film to cross the  mark in collections in the history of Tamil cinema. It also won the National Film Award for Best Feature Film in Tamil, and two Filmfare Awards South: Best Film – Tamil and Best Actress – Tamil (Jayalalithaa).

Plot 
Mookkaiyan belongs to a well-to-do family and lives in the village Sholavandan. He is held in high esteem by the villagers for his prowess. One day, his uncle Chockalingam, Chockalingam's wife Bama and their foreign-educated daughter Kalpana come to Sholavandan to participate in the Mariamman festival. Kalpana is fascinated by Mookaiyan's prowess; her mother disapproves of Kalpana's emotional reaction while her father is happy. Bama settles a young man of Madurai to marry Kalpana. Moved by the pleas of Chockalingam, Mookaiyan goes to the bridegroom's house and brings back Kalpana, saying that he has the right by birth to marry her.

Married life starts well for Mookaiyan and Kalpana, but before long differences arise because of their different backgrounds. At Kalpana's birthday party, Mookaiyan objects to drinking and dancing by her hippie friends. He beats Kalpana, and she leaves him to join her mother. A lawyer's notice for divorce is received. Mookaiyan futilely tries to make Bama understand the situation. The mother and daughter are adamant and Mookaiyan returns home determined to teach them a lesson.

Kalpana, having been impregnated by Mookaiyan some time earlier, gives birth to a child. In her anxiety to save Kalpana from further involvements, Bama leaves the child in an orphanage. Kalpana is shocked by this act of her mother. By the time she goes to recover the child, Mookaiyan has already taken it away. Kalpana beseeches her father to get the child from Mookaiyan. Unexpectedly, Mookaiyan comes there to deliver an invitation card for his marriage with his cousin Rakkamma. Kalpana and her parents are now repentant.

Kalpana goes alone to Mookaiyan's house and asks her husband to leap over their child and then tie the thali to another girl. To her surprise, Kalpana discovers that the marriage being celebrated is that of a different man named Mookaiyan, while her husband did no injustice to her; she falls at her husband's feet and the family reunites.

Cast 
 Sivaji Ganesan as Mookkaiya Servai/Mukesh
 Jayalalithaa as Kalpana
 Shubha as Rakkamma
 S. N. Lakshmi as Mookkaiya's grandmother

 V. K. Ramasamy as Sokkalingam
 Sukumari as Bama
 M. R. R. Vasu as Minor
 Manorama as Vellaiyammal

 Samikannu as Butler Kanthasamy
 Kathadi Ramamurthy as the rickshaw man 
 Pakoda Kadhar as Puliyotharai
 Pattom Sadan as Thivitti
 Veeraragavan as Rathnam
 Papji as Sankar

Production 
Pattikada Pattanama was produced and directed by P. Madhavan, and based on the William Shakespeare comedy The Taming of the Shrew. Malayalam actress Sukumari appeared as the mother of Jayalalithaa in the film, despite being older than Jayalalithaa by only a few years. Manorama, in portraying her character, spoke in Madurai dialect. The film marked the acting debut of Shubha in Tamil. Cinematography was handled by P. N. Sundaram and the editing by R. Devarajan.

Soundtrack 
The soundtrack was composed by M. S. Viswanathan, and lyrics were written by Kannadasan. The song "Ennadi Rakkamma" is set in the Carnatic raga known as Shanmukhapriya. It was well received and remains a cult classic. The song was later remixed by D. Imman in Vaadaa (2010). D. Karthikeyan of The Hindu writing about T. M. Soundararajan mentioned that his "folksy number Ennadi Rakkamma Pallakku from Pattikada Pattanama still makes people go crazy with its rustic beats and beautiful rendition and the song is a must in cultural festivals in Madurai". The song "Kettukodi" was remixed by Kavi Periyathambi in Pandi Oliperukki Nilayam (2012).

Release and reception 
Pattikada Pattanama was released on 6 May 1972, and distributed by Sivaji Films. The film became a commercial success, running for over 175 days in theatres, thereby becoming a silver jubilee film. Politician K. Kamaraj praised the film, saying it demonstrated the need to practice one's culture and the traditions of "one wife for one husband". The Tamil magazine Ananda Vikatan in a review dated 28 June 1972, praised Ganesan's energetic performance and the outdoor cinematography, but called the film a usual old wine in new bottle story. The film won two Filmfare Awards South: Best Film – Tamil and Best Actress – Tamil (Jayalalithaa), and the National Film Award for Best Feature Film in Tamil.

References

Bibliography

External links 
 

1970s Tamil-language films
1972 films
1972 romantic comedy films
Best Tamil Feature Film National Film Award winners
Films based on The Taming of the Shrew
Films directed by P. Madhavan
Films scored by M. S. Viswanathan
Indian films based on plays
Indian romantic comedy films